Johannes Govertus de Man (2 May 1850 in Middelburg – 9 January 1930 in Middelburg), was a Dutch biologist. His change away from vertebrates disappointed the director of the museum, and de Man left his job there after eleven years. For the rest of his life, de Man worked at his parents' house in Middelburg and later at a house near the shore at Yerseke in the Oosterschelde estuary, relying on his family's private income.

Taxa named after de Man

Anachis demani De Jong & Coomans, 1988
Anchistus demani Kemp, 1922
Araeolaimus demani (Schuurmans-Stekhoven, 1950) Wieser, 1956
Axonolaimus demani De Coninck & Stekhoven, 1933
Caridina demani J. Roux, 1911
Charybdis (Goniosoma) demani Leene, 1937
Chromadorina demani Inglis, 1962
Clibanarius demani Buitendijk, 1937
Criconema demani Micoletzky, 1925
Demania Laurie, 1906
Demaniella Steiner, 1914
Demanietta Bott, 1966
Demanietta manii (Rathbun, 1904)
Dracograllus demani Allen & Noffsinger, 1978
Dromia (Cryptodromia) de Manii Alcock, 1899 (a synonym of Cryptodromia amboinensis De Man, 1888)
Eleutherolaimus demani (Rouville, 1903)
Engina demani De Jong & Coomans, 1988
Etisus demani Odhner, 1925
Exopalaemon mani (Sollaud, 1914)
Gonodactylellus demanii (Henderson, 1893)
Hemicycliophora demanii (Edward & Rai, 1971)
Labuanium demani (Bürger, 1893)
Manella Rathbun, 1906
Metapenaeus demani (J. Roux, 1922)
Metoncholaimus demani (Zur Strassen, 1894)
Molgolaimus demani Jensen, 1978
Neoliomera demani Forest & Guinot, 1962
Palaemon sundaicus De Mani Nobili, 1899 (a synonym of Macrobrachium equidens (Dana, 1852))
Panulirus demani Borradaile, 1899 (a synonym of P. versicolor (Latreille, 1804))
Percnon demani Ward, 1934
Periclimenes demani Kemp, 1915
Petrarctus demani (Holthuis, 1963)
Phascolosoma (Satonus) demanni (Sluiter, 1891)
Pontophilus demani Chace, 1984
Processa demani Hayashi, 1975
Pseudocollodes demani Balss, 1929
Rhabdodemania Baylis & Daubney, 1926
Richtersia demani Stekhoven, 1935
Sabatieria demani Bresslau & Stekhoven in Stekoven, 1935
Scyllarus demani Holthuis, 1946
Synalpheus demani Borradaile, 1899
Thalamita de Mani Nobili, 1905 (a synonym of T. invicta Thallwitz, 1891)
Tricoma demanema, Chromadorita demaniana Filipjev, 1922
Uca demani Ortmann, 1897
Uca manii Rathbun, 1909 (a synonym of U. forcipata (Adams & White, 1848))
Urocaris de Mani Balss, 1916 (a synonym of Periclimenes scriptus (Risso, 1822))
Vir Holthuis, 1952 (Latin  = man)
Xantho demani Odhner, 1925 (a synonym of Lachnopodus subacutus (Stimpson, 1858))
Zozymodea demani (Odhner, 1925)

Taxa named by de Man

De Man described many new taxa in his lifetime, mostly for crustaceans and nematodes. His crustacean taxa include 30 genera and 523 new species, while his nematode taxa comprise 8 new families, 61 new genera and 239 new species. Taxa described by de Man include:
Alope orientalis De Man, 1906
Alpheus rapacida De Man, 1908
Caridina gracilirostris De Man, 1892
Caridina serratirostris De Man, 1892
Cuapetes amymone De Man, 1902
Eiconaxius sibogae De Man, 1925
Geosesarma De Man, 1892
Laomenes amboinensis (De Man, 1888)
Lysmata amboinensis De Man, 1888
Macrobrachium rosenbergii (De Man, 1879)
Neosarmatium inerme De Man, 1887
Neosarmatium meinerti De Man, 1887
Palinurellus wieneckii (De Man, 1881)
Perisesarma De Man, 1895
Sesarma eulimene De Man, 1895
Thor amboinensis (De Man, 1888)

Further reading

References

Dutch biologists
Dutch carcinologists
1850 births
1930 deaths
People from Middelburg, Zeeland